Juan Santiago can refer to:
Juan Santiago, Dominican Republic, a municipality in the Elías Piña Province
Juan Santiago (boxer), an American professional welterweight boxer
Juan Santiago Gordón, a Chilean hurdler
Juan Carlos Santiago, a former Spanish basketball player
Juan Santiago, a character on General Hospital
Juan Santiago (footballer), an Uruguayan footballer who played in the 1945 South American Championship